Shadow Hawk or ShadowHawk may refer to:
Shadow Hawk, a historical novel by Andre Norton
 Groen ShadowHawk, an American gyroplane design
 ShadowHawk (character), a fictional comic book character